Vladimir Alekseevich Kanaykin (born 21 March 1985) is a Russian race walker.

Career 
He won the 2002 World Junior Championships in the 10 km race, took the silver medal at the 2004 World Junior Championships and finished ninth in the 50 km race at the 2006 European Championships.

He competed at the 2005 World Championships, but was disqualified.

On September 29, 2007 Kanaykin set a new world record for the 20 km race walk at the 2007 IAAF Race Walking Challenge Final, in Saransk, Russia. He walked a time of 1 hour, 17 minutes, 16 seconds to break the record previously held by three-time world champion Jefferson Pérez of Ecuador. 

Kanaykin competed in the 20 km race at the London Olympics in 2012, but was disqualified.

Doping scandal 
On August 5, 2008, Kanaykin and his training partners Sergey Morozov, Viktor Burayev, and Aleksey Voyevodin, who are all coached by Viktor Chegin, were banned from competing for two years by the World Anti-Doping Agency (WADA) after testing positive for EPO. The positive tests were conducted in April 2008 and evidenced doping. He took the silver in men's 20 km race walk in 1:20:27 at the 2011 World Championships in Athletics in Daegu.

On 20 January 2015, Kanaykin was disqualified for life starting from 17 December 2012, and all his results between 25 January 2011 and 25 March 2011, as well as between 16 June 2011 and 27 September 2011 were annulled. On March 25, 2015, the IAAF filed an appeal with the Court of Arbitration in Lausanne, Switzerland, questioning the selective disqualification of the suspension periods of the six athletes involved including Kanaykin.  On March 24, 2016, the court ruled and disqualified all of Kanaykin's results from February 11, 2011 to December 17, 2012.

International competitions

Kanaykin was originally seventh at the 2011 European Race Walking Cup, silver medallist at the 2011 World Championships in Athletics, bronze medallist at the 2012 IAAF World Race Walking Cup, and gold medallist at the 2012 Summer Olympics.

References

External links

trackfield.brinkster

1985 births
Living people
People from Mordovia
Sportspeople from Mordovia
Russian male racewalkers
Olympic male racewalkers
Olympic athletes of Russia
Athletes (track and field) at the 2012 Summer Olympics
World Athletics Championships athletes for Russia
World Athletics Championships medalists
Athletes stripped of World Athletics Championships medals
World Athletics U20 Championships winners
World Youth Championships in Athletics winners
Russian Athletics Championships winners
World record setters in athletics (track and field)
Doping cases in athletics
Russian sportspeople in doping cases